Cameron Delaney is a former professional Australian rules footballer who played for the North Melbourne Football Club in the Australian Football League, he was also listed with the Geelong Football Club without playing a senior match.

Delaney was recruited by the club in the 2010 National Draft in with pick number 69. North Melbourne was not only the club that Delaney supported growing up, but also the club at which his brother, Luke, played for at the time. He made his debut in Round 2, 2012, against .

Delaney was delisted at the conclusion of the 2014 AFL season but told that he would be re-drafted via the rookie draft in the 2014 AFL Draft. However, he was selected in that draft by Geelong at pick 31, one pick before the selection with which North Melbourne had committed to re-draft him. At the conclusion of the 2016 season, he was delisted without playing a senior match for Geelong.

Statistics

|- style="background-color: #EAEAEA"
! scope="row" style="text-align:center" | 2011
|
| 31 || 0 || — || — || — || — || — || — || — || — || — || — || — || — || — || —
|-
! scope="row" style="text-align:center" | 2012
|
| 31 || 5 || 0 || 1 || 40 || 31 || 71 || 16 || 12 || 0.0 || 0.2 || 8.0 || 6.2 || 14.2 || 3.2 || 2.4
|- style="background-color: #EAEAEA"
! scope="row" style="text-align:center" | 2013
|
| 31 || 1 || 0 || 0 || 15 || 4 || 19 || 12 || 1 || 0.0 || 0.0 || 15.0 || 4.0 || 19.0 || 12.0 || 1.0
|-
! scope="row" style="text-align:center" | 2014
|
| 31 || 0 || — || — || — || — || — || — || — || — || — || — || — || — || — || —
|- style="background-color: #EAEAEA"
! scope="row" style="text-align:center" | 2015
|
| 45 || 0 || — || — || — || — || — || — || — || — || — || — || — || — || — || —
|-
! scope="row" style="text-align:center" | 2016
|
| 45 || 0 || — || — || — || — || — || — || — || — || — || — || — || — || — || —
|- class="sortbottom"
! colspan=3| Career
! 6
! 0
! 1
! 55
! 35
! 90
! 28
! 13
! 0.0
! 0.2
! 9.2
! 5.8
! 15.0
! 4.7
! 2.2
|}

References

External links

1992 births
Living people
North Melbourne Football Club players
Australian rules footballers from Victoria (Australia)
Geelong Falcons players
North Ballarat Football Club players